Coleophora accola is a moth of the family Coleophoridae.

The larvae feed on the generative organs of Halothamnus glaucus.

References

accola
Moths described in 1992